Van Buren Malone (born July 1, 1970) is a former safety in the National Football League (NFL) and former defensive coordinator for the SMU Mustangs football team. He played his entire career from 1994–1997 with the Detroit Lions. He was previously the cornerbacks coach for the Tulsa Golden Hurricane in the 2010–11 season.

References

External links
 Kansas State profile

1970 births
Living people
American football safeties
Detroit Lions players
Kansas State Wildcats football coaches
North Dakota State Bison football coaches
North Texas Mean Green football coaches
Oklahoma State Cowboys football coaches
SMU Mustangs football coaches
Texas A&M Aggies football coaches
Texas Longhorns football players
Tulsa Golden Hurricane football coaches
Western Michigan Broncos football coaches
High school football coaches in Texas
Sportspeople from Houston
Players of American football from Houston
African-American coaches of American football
African-American players of American football
21st-century African-American sportspeople
20th-century African-American sportspeople